BettyConfidential.com is a United States women’s online magazine. It has 2.5 million unique visitors a month. Its comScore is 7, above glam.com, posh.com, Instyle.com, Elle.com and Allure.com. On April 28, 2010, BettyConfidential won Editorial Excellence at min's Best of the Web Awards, beating out Conde Nast’s Concierge.com, The Daily Beast and FourSeasonsMagazine.com.

History 
Launched in March 2008, BettyConfidential.com was co–founded by author and television commentator Deborah Perry Piscione and Internet entrepreneur Shaun Marsh. After conducting  studies of women on the internet, both Piscione and Marsh wanted to connect women who shared similar life stages, circumstance, goals, and interest in order for them to help and support other women.

The name Betty was chosen for the website to convey a trustworthy friend. Confidential was chosen to represent the hidden aspirations that exist in all women.
 March 5, 2008: NBC 11, the NBC affiliate for the San Francisco Bay Area, produced a full segment profiling BettyConfidential.com.
 March 9, 2008: msnbc and WCAU-TV of Philadelphia profiled BettyConfidential.com.
 March 10, 2008: Local Las Vegas NBC-TV affiliate, KVBC Channel 3, profiles BettyConfidential.com in the story "Women on the Web." Watch the segment.
 March 11, 2008: BettyConfidential.com officially launches. Read the press release. 
 March 11, 2008: The BettyConfidential.com launch was covered by several major outlets, including CNBC and SmartMoney magazine.
 March 13, 2008: BettyConfidential.com is recognized in Condé Nast Portfolio magazine. 
 March 13, 2008: BettyConfidential.com's co-founder, Deborah Perry Piscione, is profiled in the San Jose Mercury News.
 March 15, 2008: BettyConfidential.com and several BettyConfidential.com users are profiled on the widely syndicated TechNow! television program.
 March 16, 2008: Local New York City CBS Radio affiliate, Fresh 102.7, interviews BettyConfidential.com co-founder, Deborah Perry Piscione. * March 20, 2008: Our BettyConfidential.com staff was interviewed on KGO Newstalk Radio about pending California legislation proposing dedicated parking spaces for pregnant women. 
 April 2, 2008: BettyConfidential.com announces The 10 Most Inspirational Women of 2008.
 December 21, 2008: The Pittsburgh Post-Gazette interviewed Betty's editor-in-chief, * Myrna Blyth, about her move from magazines to the Web.
 February 4, 2009: NBC interviewed Betty's CEO Deborah Perry Piscione about our release Betty's Bests: Top 5 Best Places to Meet the Guy of Your Dreams. 
 February 20, 2009: MSNBC reported on Betty's use of revolutionary technology to cover the Oscars. * * February 28, 2009: The Washington Post quoted our story "Mommy Bloggers on Michelle Obama."
 March 2009: Good Housekeeping covered our survey: Why Women Lie. * March 26, 2009: MTV.com covered Betty's scoop: Nick Jonas Dating Jordan Pruitt. 
 March 27, 2009: Lisa Bloom appeared on CNN's HLN to discuss her exclusive story on BettyConfidential.com Why Gloria Allred Was Fired by Octomom. April 10, 2009: The San Francisco Chronicle noted that Deborah Perry Piscione, Betty's CEO and co-founder, was part of a brainstorming power breakfast in which the 15 attendees discussed breast cancer research with Nancy Brinker, founder of the Susan G. Komen for the Cure foundation (and sister of Komen, who died in 1980).
 April 16, 2009: BettyConfidential special correspondent, Lisa Bloom, appeared on Dr. Phil to talk about sexting. 
 July 31, 2009: The ladies of The View discussed Betty's story 5 Best Spots to Meet the Father of Your Children. 
 September 8, 2009: Fox News ran our interview with Joan Rivers.
 September 28, 2009: My Fox National mentioned "Mean Betty's" article on the Spanish Prime Minister's daughters. 
Deborah Perry Piscione, Betty's CEO and co-founder, is one of the recipients of the Women's Initiative "Women-Owned Business of the Year" award on * November 10, 2009.
Myrna Blyth, BettyConfidential's Editor-in-Chief, was named one of Min's "Top 21 Social Media Superstars." 
 May 28, 2010, PJ Gach, BettyConfidential's Style+Beauty Editor was profiled in BeautifulStranger.TV.
 June 23, 2010: PJ Gach, BettyConfidential's Style+Beauty Editor was profiled in Crushable.com. 
June 23, 2010:BettyConfidential was selected as one of ForbesWoman's Top 100 Websites for Women in 2010.
 July 14, 2010: PJ Gach, senior editor Style+Beauty was interviewed as a style expert for the article, 101:How To Be Better Looking in Crushable.com.
BettyConfidential partners with Six Apart. * July 27, 2010: BettyConfidential’s CEO, Deborah Perry Piscione, was interviewed by The New York Times about a very hot topic — maternity leave for working women.
 September 16, 2010: BettyConfidential is recognized as a pioneering company in the digital entertainment age and is selected as one of the 2010 OnHollywood 100 Top Private Companies by AlwaysOn.

Contributors 
The editorial department is headed up by editor-in-chief April Daniels Hussar. It was previously run by Myrna Blyth -author, TV commentator and editor in chief of Ladies' Home Journal, and founding editor-in-chief of More Magazine. The editorial staff is Sarah Polonsky, senior editor: Celebrities, Jane Farrell, senior editor: Mama Betty, Libby Keatinge, senior editor: Love+Sex,  PJ Gach, senior editor: Style+Beauty, Faye Brennan, assistant editor, Kathryn H. Cusimano, assistant editor, Carolyn French, editorial assistant. A comprehensive list of contributors can be found here https://web.archive.org/web/20090416131706/http://www.bettyconfidential.com/ci/team.html.

CNN’s Soledad O'Brien serves as chairman of the advisory board. Members of BettyConfidential.com’s advisory board are listed here https://web.archive.org/web/20090414140658/http://www.bettyconfidential.com/ci/advisoryboard.html.

References 

 https://web.archive.org/web/20091028160018/http://www.bettyconfidential.com/ar/ld/a/Deborah-Perry-Piscione-Wins-Womens-Initiative-Woman-Owned-Business-of-the-Year.html

External links 
BettyConfdiential.com

American women's websites
Internet forums